Al-Muid li-Din Illah (المعيد لدين الله, died 1030) was an imam of the Zaidi state in Yemen who reigned in the period 1027–1030.

After 1002, the Zaidi imamate in highland Yemen was contested between various claimants. A Caspian Zaidi leader in Persia, Abu Talib Yahya, is sometimes formally counted as imam in the period 1020–1033 in Zaydiyyah historiography. Meanwhile, the brother of the old imam al-Mahdi al-Husayn, Ja'far, ruled the Zaidi centre Sa'dah as emir for periods. In 1027 a new pretender of obscure origins appeared and claimed the imamate. He proclaimed himself under the title al-Mu'id li-Din Illah (he who brings people back to God). He actually managed to establish his authority in the important city San'a. Nevertheless, he was killed by opponents already in 1030.

See also

 Imams of Yemen
 Rassids

References

Zaydi imams of Yemen
1030 deaths
Year of birth unknown
11th century in Yemen
11th-century Arabs